The Halifax School for the Blind opened on Morris Street, Halifax, Nova Scotia as the Halifax Asylum for the Blind in 1871, the first residential school for the blind in Canada. The first superintendent of the school (1873-1923) was Sir Frederick Fraser who was himself visually impaired and had studied at the Perkins School for the Blind in Boston.

A private school for the first century of its existence, in 1975 the school became a public institution under the newly created Atlantic Provinces Special Education Authority (APSEA), and it provided free education to pupils from throughout Atlantic Canada.

The school closed in 1983 and was replaced by a new school some blocks away, named Sir Frederick Fraser School for the Blind in memory of the founder. A memorial plaque was placed near the site of the old school in 2012.

The Halifax School for the Deaf was established earlier in 1856. The two schools were consolidated at the APSEA Centre on South Street in 1994-1995.

Notable students 
 Arthur A. Chisholm
 Vivian Berkeley
 Eric Davidson
 Terry Kelly
 Fred McKenna

Notable teachers 
 Elizabeth Roberts MacDonald

References

External links and further reading

 Annual Report. 1939
 School for the Blind Image, Notman Studio
 Frederick Fraser: What we do for the Blind, Toronto Star, 1918
 Shirley Trites. "Reading Hands: The Halifax School for the Blind". 2003
 Nova Scotia Archives, Halifax School for the Blind fonds (Contains Halifax Explosion 1917 eye injury records)

Schools in Halifax, Nova Scotia
Schools for the blind in Canada